Mladen Veselinović (Serbian Cyrillic: Младен Веселиновић; born 4 January 1993) is a Bosnian professional footballer who plays as a midfielder. He most recently played for Bosnian Premier League club Željezničar.

Honours
Viktoria Plzeň
Czech First League runner up: 2013–14
Czech Cup runner up: 2013–14
Czech Supercup runner up: 2013

Sloboda Tuzla 
Bosnian Premier League runner up: 2015–16
Bosnian Cup runner up: 2015–16

References

External links
Mladen Veselinović at Sofascore

1993 births
Living people
Sportspeople from Zenica
Serbs of Bosnia and Herzegovina
Association football midfielders
Bosnia and Herzegovina footballers
FK Sloga Doboj players
FC Viktoria Plzeň players
FK Baník Most players
FK Sloboda Tuzla players
FK Borac Banja Luka players
FK Željezničar Sarajevo players 
Czech First League players
Premier League of Bosnia and Herzegovina players
Bosnia and Herzegovina expatriate footballers
Expatriate footballers in the Czech Republic
Bosnia and Herzegovina expatriate sportspeople in the Czech Republic